The Survivalist may refer to:

 The Survivalist (2015 film), a British thriller directed by Stephen Fingleton
 The Survivalist (2021 film), an American thriller directed by	Jon Keeyes
 The Survivalist (novel series), 29 novels by Jerry Ahern

See also
Survivalism (disambiguation)